Air dam may refer to various aerodynamic devices:

Spoiler (car), on automobiles
Spoiler (aeronautics), on aircraft
Trailer skirt, on semi-trailers